Scarface (also known as Scarface: The Shame of the Nation and The Shame of a Nation) is a 1932 American pre-Code gangster film directed by Howard Hawks and produced by Hawks and Howard Hughes. The screenplay, by Ben Hecht, is based loosely on the 1929 novel by Armitage Trail which was inspired by Al Capone. The film stars Paul Muni as Italian immigrant gangster Antonio "Tony" Camonte, a gangster who violently rises through the Chicago gangland, with a supporting cast that includes George Raft and Boris Karloff. Camonte's rise to power dovetails with his relentless pursuit of his boss's mistress while his own sister pursues his best hitman. In an overt tie to the life of Capone, one scene depicts a version of the Saint Valentine's Day Massacre.

After Hughes purchased the rights to Trail's novel, Hughes quickly selected Hawks to direct and Hecht to write the film's screenplay. Beginning in January 1931, Hecht wrote the script over an eleven-day period. Scarface was produced before the introduction of the Production Code in 1934, which enforced regulations on film content. However, the Hays Code, a more lenient precursor, called for major alterations, including a prologue condemning gangsters, an alternate ending to more clearly reprehended Camonte, and the alternative title The Shame of a Nation. The censors believed the film glorified violence and crime. These changes delayed the film by a year, though some showings retained the original ending. Modern showings of the film have the original ending, though some DVD releases also include the alternate ending as a feature; these versions maintain the changes Hughes and Hawks were required to make for approval by the Hays Office. No completely unaltered version was known to exist until the limited edition set of Scarface (1983) was released on October 15, 2019.

Audience reception was positive, but censors banned the film in several cities and states, forcing Hughes to remove it from circulation and store it in his vault. The rights to the film were recovered after Hughes's death in the 1970s. Alongside Little Caesar and The Public Enemy (both 1931), Scarface is regarded as one of the most significant and influential gangster films.

Scarface was added to the National Film Registry in 1994 by the Library of Congress. In 2008, the American Film Institute listed Scarface as the sixth-best gangster film. It was remade as the 1983 film of the same title starring Al Pacino.

Plot

In 1920s Chicago, Italian immigrant and notorious thug Antonio "Tony" Camonte works as a bodyguard for crime lord "Big" Louis Costillo. Siding with Costillo's disgruntled lieutenant John "Johnny" Lovo, Tony guns down his boss. Lovo takes over Costillo's territory in the South Side and has Tony and his associates, Angelo and Guino "Little Boy" Rinaldo, set up a lucrative bootlegging operation selling illegal beer to all of the bars there.

Tony urges Lovo to start moving in on the North Side, where the bootlegging is controlled by the Irish gangs of gangster O'Hara; Lovo refuses, ordering Tony to leave the North Side alone. Tony ignores these orders and starts attacking O'Hara's businesses while expanding his rackets to the North. Before long, Lovo is forced out of his position as Tony wins over their gang with his success.

Meanwhile, Tony pursues Johnny's girlfriend Poppy. At first, she is dismissive of him, but pays him more attention as his reputation rises and he starts flaunting his wealth. She visits his "gaudy" apartment where he shows her his view of an electric billboard advertising Cook's Tours, which features the slogan which inspires him: "The World Is Yours".

Tony finally gets rid of O'Hara by having Guino assassinate him. O'Hara's successor, Tom Gaffney, declares war on the South Side and attempts to kill Tony in a restaurant with tommy guns – which an excited Tony quickly arms his own men with. The war results in Gaffney's gang being killed off one by one until he's forced to go into hiding. A group of prominent citizens, including the police chief, vow to bring Tony down for all the carnage and bloodshed he has inflicted on the city.

During a night out at the theater, Tony learns that Gaffney and his entourage are at a nearby bowling alley. Leaving Angelo behind to watch the rest of the show, Tony personally kills Gaffney. Lovo's anger at Tony finally boils over when Tony openly flirts and dances with Poppy in front of him at dinner. Tony sees his beloved sister Francesca "Cesca" dancing with a stranger and takes her to his mother's home by force before hitting and yelling at her. A crew of gunmen later try to assassinate him, but he runs them off the road with his bulletproof car.

Suspecting Lovo's involvement, Tony goes to his office after bribing one of Lovo's men to call him and pretend to be part of the hit crew. When Lovo hangs up after claiming that he must have gotten a wrong number, Tony forces him to confess to the hit and then has Guino kill him. Tony, now the undisputed ruler of the city's underworld, takes Poppy on an expensive vacation to Florida to escape the police and media attention, while Cesca secretly visits Guino at Tony's office.

 Returning home, Tony learns from his mother that Cesca has moved in with another man and rushes over to find her with Guino. He kills his friend in a jealous rage, and Cesca runs away in tears after revealing that they had just gotten married and were planning to surprise him. The police issue a warrant for Tony's arrest, and he barricades himself in his home while Angelo is killed trying to protect him.

Cesca slips inside, planning to kill her brother, but then gives in and admits her love for him. Tony and Cesca arm themselves and Tony shoots at the police from the window, laughing maniacally. Moments later, however, Cesca is killed by a stray bullet. Calling Cesca's name as the apartment fills with tear gas, Tony stumbles down the stairs just as the police break down his door. Tony pleads for his life but makes a break for it, resulting in the officers outside shooting him multiple times. He stumbles for a moment, falls in the gutter and dies. Above the sounds of cheering, the electric billboard blazes "The World Is Yours".

Cast

Production

Development
Business tycoon Howard Hughes, then involved in film-making, wanted a box office hit after the success of his 1931 film The Front Page. Gangster films were topical in the early 1930s in the age of Prohibition, and Hughes wanted to make a film based on the life of gangster Al Capone superior to all other films in the genre. He was advised against making the film, as the genre was crowded; Little Caesar starring Edward G. Robinson and The Public Enemy starring James Cagney were already box-office successes, and Warner Bros. claimed nothing new could be done with the gangster genre. Furthermore, industry censors such as the Hays Office were becoming concerned with the glamorization of crime in media.

Hughes bought the rights to Armitage Trail's novel Scarface, inspired by the life of Capone. Trail wrote for a number of detective story magazines during the early 1920s, but died of a heart attack at the age of 28, shortly before the release of Scarface. Hughes hired Fred Pasley, a New York reporter and authority on Capone, as a writer. Hughes asked Ben Hecht, who in 1929 had won the first Academy Award for Best Original Screenplay for his silent crime film Underworld, to be head writer. Suspicious of Hughes as an employer, Hecht requested a daily salary of $1,000, to be paid every day at six o'clock. Hecht claimed he would only waste a day's labor if Hughes turned out to be a fraud.

Hughes wanted film director Howard Hawks to direct and co-produce. This surprised Hawks, as the two had never been friendly; Hughes had filed a lawsuit against Howard Hawks in July 1930, alleging that Hawks's film The Dawn Patrol had plagiarized his film Hell's Angels. Over a game of golf, Hughes promised to drop the lawsuit (irrelevant as it had already been dismissed by the judge), and by the eighteenth hole, Hawks had become interested in directing the film. He became more convinced when he discovered Hecht would be the head writer. Hecht and Hawks worked together well, intending to portray the Capone character as of the Borgia Family, including the suggestion of incest between the main character and his sister, present in Trail's novel.

Writing
Hecht wrote the screenplay over eleven days in January 1931, adapted from Trail's novel. Additional writing was provided by Fred Pasley and W.R. Burnett, author of the novel Little Caesar, upon which the film Little Caesar was based. Pasley's contributions included elements of the book Al Capone: Biography of a Self-Made Man; the book contains a barbershop scene with Capone similar to the introduction of Tony Camonte in the film. Pasley was not credited for his work on the screenplay. John Lee Mahin and Seton I. Miller rewrote the script for continuity and dialogue.

Because there were five writers, it is difficult to distinguish which components were contributed by which writer; however, the ending of Scarface is similar to Hecht's first gangster film Underworld, in which gangster Bull Weed traps himself in his apartment with his lover and fires at the hordes of police outside, and thus was likely a Hecht contribution.

The film version of Scarface bears little resemblance to the novel. Though the film contains the same major characters, plot points, and incestual undertones, changes were made to reduce the length and the number of characters, and to satisfy the requests of censorship offices. To make gangsters appear less admirable, Tony's character was made to appear less intelligent and more brutish than in the novel. Similarly, the sibling relationship between Tony and the police officer was removed to avoid depicting police corruption.

Ties to Capone
Both the film and novel are loosely based upon the life of gangster Al Capone, whose nickname was "Scarface". The names of characters and locations were changed only minimally. Capone became Camonte, Torrio became Lovo, and Moran became Doran. In some early scripts, Colosimo was Colisimo and O'Bannion was Bannon, but the names were changed to Costillo and O'Hara respectively. This, including other alterations made to characters and other identifying locations to maintain anonymity, were due to censorship and Hawks's concern about the overuse of historical details.

Ben Hecht had met Capone and "knew a lot about Chicago", so he did no research for the script. According to Hecht, while he worked on the script, Capone sent two men to visit him in Hollywood to make sure the film was not based on Capone's life. He told them the Scarface character was a parody of numerous people, and that the title was chosen as it was intriguing. The two left Hecht alone.

The references to Capone and actual events from the Chicago gang wars were obvious to audiences at the time. Muni's character had a scar similar to Capone's, received in similar fights. The police in the film mention Camonte is a member of the Five Points Gang in Brooklyn, of which Capone was a known member. Tony kills his boss "Big Louis" Costillo in the lobby of his club; Capone was involved in the murder of his first boss "Big Jim" Colosimo in 1920. Rival boss O'Hara is murdered in his flower shop; Capone's men murdered Dean O'Bannion in his flower shop in 1924. The assassination of seven men in a garage, with two of the gunmen costumed as police officers, mirrors the St. Valentine's Day Massacre of 1929. The leader of this rival gang narrowly escapes the shooting, as did gang leader Bugs Moran. The film opens at the intersection of 22nd Street and Wabash Avenue in the middle of Capone's South Side, the site of many Capone's crimes.

Despite the clear references to Capone, Capone was rumored to have liked the film so much he owned a print of it. However, this was likely an exaggerated claim by Hawks as Capone was imprisoned in Atlanta for tax evasion during the film's release.

Casting

Hawks and Hughes found casting difficult as most actors were under contract and studios were reluctant to allow their artists to freelance for independent producers. Producer Irving Thalberg suggested Clark Gable, but Hawks believed Gable was a personality, not an actor. After seeing Paul Muni on Broadway, talent agent Al Rosen suggested him for the lead role. Muni initially declined, feeling he was not physically suited for the role, but after reading the script, his wife Bella convinced him to take it. After a test run in New York, Hughes, Hawks, and Hecht approved Muni for the role.

Boris Karloff was cast as Irish gangster Gaffney, listed on a theatrical release poster as "Boris 'Frankenstein' Karloff". Jack La Rue was cast as Tony Camonte's sidekick Guino Rinaldo (modeled after Al Capone's bodyguard Frank Rio) but as he was taller than Muni, Hawks worried he would overshadow Muni's tough Scarface persona. He was replaced with George Raft, a struggling actor at the time, after Hawks encountered him at a prizefight. Raft had played an almost identical part the previous year as his feature film debut in Quick Millions, a gangster film starring Spencer Tracy, but the Scarface role would catapult Raft to stardom.

Though Karen Morley was under contract at MGM, Hawks was close with MGM studio executive Eddie Mannix, who loaned out Morley for the film. She was reportedly given the choice between the role of Poppy or Cesca. Though Cesca was the stronger role, she chose Poppy as she felt Cesca would be a better fit for her friend Ann Dvorak. She considered this "probably the nicest thing [she] did in [her] life". Morley invited 20-year-old Dvorak to a party at Hawks' house to introduce them. According to Hawks, at the party, Dvorak zeroed in on George Raft who played her love interest. He initially declined her invitation to dance. She tried to dance in front of him in order to lure him; eventually, he gave in, and their dance together stopped the party. After this event, Hawks was interested in casting her but had reservations about her lack of experience. After a screen test, he gave her the part, and MGM was willing to release her from her contract as a chorus girl. Dvorak had to both receive permission from her mother Anna Lehr and to win a petition presented to the Superior Court to be able to sign on with Howard Hawks as a minor.

Filming
Filming lasted six months, which was long for films made in the early 1930s. Howard Hughes remained off-set to avoid interfering with the filming of the movie. Hughes urged Hawks to make the film as visually exciting as possible by adding car chases, crashes, and machine-gun fire. Hawks shot the film at three different locations: Metropolitan Studios, Harold Lloyd Studios and the Mayan Theater in Los Angeles. Filming took three months with the cast and crew working seven days a week. For the most violent scene of the film in the restaurant, Hawks cleared the set to avoid harming extras and had the set fired on by machine guns. The actors acted out the scene in front of a screen with the shooting projected in the back, so as everyone crowded under the tables in the restaurant, the room appeared to be simultaneously under fire.

During filming, Hawks and Hughes met with the Hays Office to discuss revisions. Despite that, Scarface was filmed and put together quickly. In September 1931, a rough cut of the film was screened for the California Crime Commission and police officials, neither of whom thought the movie was a dangerous influence for audiences or would elicit a criminal response. Irving Thalberg was given an advanced screening and was impressed by the film. Despite the positive feedback the film was given, the Hays Office was insistent on changes before final approval.

Censorship
Scarface was produced and filmed during Pre-Code era of Hollywood, which spanned from 1930 to 1934. The Pre-Code era is characterized by its informal and haphazard screening and regulation of film content, before the establishment of the Production Code Administration (PCA) on July 1, 1934. Before the influence of the PCA, censorship was overseen by the Motion Pictures Producers and Distributors of America (MPPDA). In 1930, Will Hays, the chairman of the MPPDA, attempted to regulate the content of movies; the MPPDA became known as the Hays Office. The goal of the Hays Office was to censor nudity, sexuality, drug use and crime. More specific to Scarface, the Hays Office wanted to avoid the sympathetic portrayal of crime by either showing criminals recognizing the error of their ways or showing criminals get punished. The Hays Office, however, did not have authority to remove material from a film until the MPPDA officially pledged to adhere to the Production Code in 1934, so they relied on delaying film release and lobbying to remove scenes or prevent movies from being produced. Films evaded the Hays Office by adding extremely suggestive scenes so they could remove them and satisfy the Hays Office enough that they wouldn't notice the lesser immoralities that remained in the film.

J.E. Smyth described Scarface as "one of the most highly censored films in Hollywood history." Howard Hawks believed the Hays Office had personal vendettas against the movie, while Hughes believed the censorship was due to "ulterior and political motives" of corrupt politicians. However, James Wingate of the New York censor boards rebutted that Hughes was preoccupied with "box office publicity" in producing the film. After repeated demands for a script rewrite from the Hays Office, Hughes ordered Hawks to shoot the film: "Screw the Hays Office, make it as realistic, and grisly as possible." The Hays Office was outraged by Scarface when they screened it. According to the Hays Office, Scarface violated the Code, because the film elicited sympathy for Muni's character and it revealed to youth a successful method of crime. The Hays office called for scenes to be deleted, scenes to be added to condemn gangsterism, and a different ending. They believed Tony's death at the end of the film was too glorifying. In addition to the violence, the MPPDA felt an inappropriate relationship between the main character and his sister was too overt, especially when he holds her in his arms after he slaps her and tears her dress; they ordered this scene be deleted. Hughes, in order to receive the MPPDA's approval, deleted the more violent scenes, added a prologue to condemn gangsterism, and wrote a new ending.

In addition, a couple of scenes were added to overtly condemn gangsterism, such as a scene in which a newspaper publisher looks at the screen and directly admonishes the government and the public for their lack of action in fighting against mob violence and a scene in which the chief detective denounces the glorification of gangsters. Hawks refused to shoot the extra scenes and the alternate ending. They were directed by Richard Rossen, earning Rossen the title of "co-director". Hughes was instructed to change the title to The Menace, Shame of the Nation or Yellow to clarify the subject of the film; after months of haggling, he compromised with the title Scarface, Shame of the Nation and by adding a foreword condemning the "gangster" in a general sense. Hughes made an attempt to release the film under the title "The Scar" when the original title was disallowed by the Hays office. Besides the title, the term "Scarface" was removed from the film. In the scene where Tony kills Rinaldo, Cesca says the word "murderer", but she can be seen mouthing the word "Scarface".

The original script had Tony's mother loving her son unconditionally, praising his lifestyle, and even accepting money and gifts from him. In addition, there was a politician who, despite campaigning against gangsters on the podium, is shown partying with them after hours. The script ends with Tony staying in the building, unaffected by tear gas and a multitude of bullets fired at him. After the building is on fire, Tony is forced to exit, guns blazing. He is sprayed with police gunfire but appears unfazed. Upon noticing the police officer who had been arresting him throughout the film, he fires at him, only to hear a single "click" noise implying his gun is empty. He is killed after the police officer shoots him several times. A repeated clicking noise is heard on the soundtrack implying he was attempting to fire while he was dying.

Alternate ending
The first version of the film (Version A) was completed on September 8, 1931, but censors required the ending be modified or they would refuse to grant Scarface a license. Paul Muni was unable to re-film the ending in 1931 due to his work on Broadway. Consequently, Hawks was forced to use a body double. The body double was mainly filmed by way of shadows and long shots in order to mask Muni's absence in these scenes. The alternate ending (Version B) differs from the original ending in the manner that Tony is caught and in which he dies. Unlike the original ending, where Tony tries to escape from the police and dies after being shot several times, in the alternate ending, Tony reluctantly hands himself over to the police. After the encounter, Tony's face is not shown. A scene follows where a judge is addressing Tony during sentencing. The next scene is the finale, in which Tony (seen from a bird's eye view) is brought to the gallows and hanged.

However, Version B did not pass the New York censors and Chicago censors. Howard Hughes felt the Hays office had suspicious intentions in rejecting the film because Hays was friends with Louis B. Mayer and Hughes believed censorship was to prevent wealthy independent competitors from producing films. Confident his film could stand out among audiences more than Mayer's films, Hughes organized a press showing of the film in Hollywood and New York. The New York Herald Tribune praised Hughes for his courage in opposing the censors. Hughes disowned the censored film and finally in 1932 released Version A with the added text introduction in states that lacked strict censors (Hughes attempted to take the New York censors to court). This 1932 release version led to bonafide box office status and positive critical reviews. Hughes was successful in subsequent lawsuits against the boards that censored the film. Due to criticism from the press, Hays claimed the version shown in theaters was the censored film he had previously approved.

Music
Due to the film's urban setting, nondiegetic music (not visible on the screen or implied to be present in the story) was not used in the film. The only music that appears in the film is during the opening and closing credits and during scenes in the movie where music appears naturally in the film's action such as in the nightclub. Adolf Tandler served as the film's musical director, while Gus Arnheim served as the orchestra's conductor. Gus Arnheim and his Cocoanut Grove Orchestra perform "Saint Louis Blues" by W.C. Handy and "Some of These Days" by Shelton Brooks in the nightclub. The tune Tony whistles in the film is the sextet from Gaetano Donizetti's opera Lucia di Lammermoor. This tune is accompanied by words that translate to, "What restrains me in such a moment?", and this tune continues to appear during violent scenes in the movie. The song Cesca sings while playing the piano is "Wreck of the Old 97".

Cultural references
The serious play Tony and his friends go to see, leaving at the end of Act 2, is John Colton and Clemence Randolph's Rain, based on W. Somerset Maugham's story "Miss Sadie Thompson". The play opened on Broadway in 1922 and ran throughout the 1920s. (A film version of the play, also titled Rain and starring Joan Crawford, was released by United Artists the same year as Scarface.) Though fairly inconspicuous in the film, and unnoticed by most viewers, the Camonte family was meant to be partially modeled after the Italo-Spanish Borgia family. This was most prominent through the subtle and arguably incestuous relationship Tony Camonte and his sister share. Camonte's excessive jealousy of his sister's affairs with other men hint at this relationship. Coincidentally, Donizetti wrote the opera for Lucrezia Borgia, about the Borgia family, and Lucia di Lammermoor from where Tony Camonte's whistle tune comes.

Release
After battling with censorship offices, the film was released around a year later than The Public Enemy and Little Caesar. Scarface was released in theaters on April 9, 1932. Hughes planned a grand premiere in New York, but New York censor boards rejected the showing of the film. State censorship boards in Ohio, Virginia, Maryland, and Kansas and citywide censorship boards in Detroit, Seattle, Portland, and Chicago banned the film as well. Hughes threatened to sue censorship boards for preventing the release of his film much to the approval of the New York Herald Tribune. Each state had a different board of censors which allowed Hughes to release the film in areas without strict censorship. At the request of Will Hays, Jason Joy convinced the strict censor boards to allow the release of Scarface, because the Hays Office acknowledged and appreciated the changes Hughes made to Scarface. Joy visited state censor boards individually, stating that while the Hays Office was against the positive portrayal of crime, gang films were actually documents against gangster life. Joy was successful and eventually all state and municipal censorship boards allowed Scarface to be released, accepting only the cut and censored version of Scarface.

Reception
At the time of release, audiences were generally positive. According to George Raft, who met Al Capone a few times at casinos, even Capone himself liked the film adding, "you tell 'em that if any of my boys are tossin' coins, they'll be twenty-dollar gold pieces." Variety cited Scarface as having "that powerful and gripping suspense which is in all gangster pictures is in this one in double doses and makes it compelling entertainment," and that the actors play, "as if they'd been doing nothing else all their lives." The National Board of Review named Scarface as one of the best pictures of 1932. However, at the time of release in 1932, there was a general public outcry about this motion picture and the gangster genre in general which negatively affected the film's box-office receipts. Jack Alicoate gave Scarface a scathing review in The Film Daily that the violence and subject matter of the film left him with, "the distinct feeling of nausea". He goes on to say the film "should never have been made" and showing the film would "do more harm to the motion picture industry, and everyone connected with it, than any picture ever shown." Although Ben Hecht was often critical of his work for Hollywood, he admitted that Scarface was "the best-directed picture [he has] seen". Hecht did, however, criticize Muni's performance. Having known Al Capone, Hecht claimed that Muni portrayed Capone as too "silent" and "moody", more similar to "Hitler". Some critics disagreed with the casting of British actor Boris Karloff, believing his accent was out of place in a gangster film; a New York Times article stated "his British accent is hardly suitable to the role". However, other critics considered him a high point. The film earned $600,000 at the box office and while Scarface was more of a financial success than Hughes's other films at the time, due to the large cost of production, it is unlikely the film did better than break even.

The film initiated outrage among Italian organizations and individuals of Italian descent, remarking a tendency of filmmakers to portray gangsters and bootleggers in their films as Italian. In the film, an Italian American makes a speech condemning gangster activities; this was added later in production to appease censors. This, however, did not prevent the Italian embassy from disapproving Scarface. Believing the film to be offensive to the Italian community, the Order Sons of Italy in America formally denounced the film and other groups urged community members to boycott the film and other films derogatory towards Italians or Italian-Americans. Will Hays wrote to the ambassador in Italy, excusing himself from scrutiny by stating the film was an anachronism because it had been delayed in production for two years and was not representative of the current practice of censorship at the time. Nazi Germany permanently prohibited showings of the film. Some cities in England banned the film as well, believing the British Board of Film Censorship's policy on gangster films was too lax. The film had been banned in Ireland on August 19, 1932 and on August 29, 1941 (under the alternate title of 'Gang War'). The decisions were upheld by the Films Appeal Board each time. It was banned on April 24, 1953 (under its original title). No appeal was lodged. Various reasons include pandering to sensationalism, glamorizing the gangster lifestyle and implying an incestuous relationship between the protagonist and his sister.

Several cities in the United States including Chicago and some states refused to show the film. The magazine Movie Classics ran an issue urging the people to demand to see the film at theaters despite the censorship bans. The film broke box-office records at the Woods Theatre in Chicago after premiering Thanksgiving Day, November 20, 1941 after having been banned from showing in Chicago by censors for nine years. Despite the favorable reception of the film among the public, the censorship battles and the unflattering reviews from some press contributed to the film's generally poor performance at the box-office. Upset at the inability to make money from Scarface, Howard Hughes removed the film from circulation. The film remained unavailable until 1979 except for occasional release prints of suspect quality from questionable sources. Hughes had plans in 1933 to direct and produce a sequel to Scarface, but due to stricter censorship rules, the film was never made.

Based on a sampling of 46 reviews on Rotten Tomatoes, Scarface holds a 98% rating, with an average rating of 8.8/10. The critics' consensus reads: "This Scarface foregoes his "little friend" and packs a different kind of heat, blending stylish visuals, thrilling violence, and an incredible cast." It holds a rating of 87 on Metacritic based on 12 reviews, indicating "universal acclaim".

Industry reception
In 1994, Scarface was selected for preservation in the United States National Film Registry by the Library of Congress as being "culturally, historically, or aesthetically significant". The character of Tony Camonte ranked at number 47 on AFI's 100 Years... 100 Heroes and Villains list. The film was named the best American sound film by critic and director Jean-Luc Godard in Cahiers du Cinéma. In June 2008, the American Film Institute revealed its "Ten Top Ten"—the best ten films in ten "classic" American film genres—after polling over 1,500 people from the creative community. Scarface was acknowledged as the sixth best in the gangster film genre. The 1983 version was placed 10th, making Scarface the only film to make the same "10 Top 10" list as its remake.

Analysis

Scholars debate whether Scarface classifies as a film with historical significance or as merely a Hollywood gangster-era motion picture. Its historical significance was augmented by the film's writing credits: W.R. Burnett, author of gangster novel Little Caesar from which the film of the same name was based on, Fred D. Pasley, a prominent Chicago gangland historian, and ex-Chicago reporter Ben Hecht. Events similar to the assassination of Jim Colismo and the St. Valentine's Day Massacre contribute to the film's realism and authenticity. Film critic Robert E. Sherwood stated that the film "merits...as a sociological or historical document," and "an utterly inexcusable attempt has been made to suppress it—not because it is obscene...but because...it comes too close to telling the truth."

Excess
According to film studies professor Fran Mason, a prominent theme in the film is excess. The opening of the film sets the stage as Big Louie Costillo sits in the remnants of a wild party, convincing his friends his next party will be bigger, better, and have "much more everything". This indicates the excessive life of a gangster, whether in pleasure or in violence. The death scene of Costillo sets the next tone of excess. In this scene, the audience sees only the shadow of Tony Camonte with a gun, hears the shots and the sound of the body hitting the floor. The violent scenes become more severe as the film progresses. Most of the violence in the film is shown through montage, as scenes go by in sequence, showing the brutal murders that Tony and his gang commit such as roughing up bar owners, a drive-by bombing, and the massacre of seven men against a wall. A scene shows a peel-off calendar rapidly changing dates while shot by a machine gun, making the excessive violence clear. The violence is not only perpetrated by the gangsters. The police in the final scene with Tony and Cesca spare no effort to catch the notorious Camonte siblings, visible through the disproportionate number of police officers and cars surrounding the apartment complex to apprehend one man. Tony and the police's excessive use of violence throughout the film normalizes it. An element of parody underlies Tony's abnormal joy in using Tommy guns. In the scene in the restaurant in which men from the North Side gang attempt to shoot Tony with a Tommy, he obtains pleasure from the power. Rather than cowering beneath the tables, he tries to peek out to watch the guns in action, laughing maniacally from his excitement. He reacts jovially upon getting his first Tommy gun and enthusiastically leaves to, "write [his] name all over the town with it in big letters."

The gangster's excessive consumption is comically represented through Tony's quest to obtain expensive goods and show them off. In Tony's first encounter with Poppy alone on the staircase, he boasts about his new suit, jewelry, and bullet-proof car. Poppy largely dismisses his advances calling his look, "kinda effeminate". His feminine consumption and obsession with looks and clothes is juxtaposed by his masculine consumption which is represented by his new car. Later, Tony shows Poppy a stack of new shirts, claiming he will wear each shirt only once. His awkwardness and ignorance of his own exorbitance make this Gatsby style scene more comical than serious. His consumption serves to symbolize the disintegration of values of modernity, specifically represented by his poor taste and obsession with money and social status. Tony's excess transcends parody and becomes dangerous because he represents a complete lack of restraint which ultimately leads to his downfall.

Tony's excess is manifested in the gang wars in the city. He is given express instruction to leave O'Hara, Gaffney, and the rest of the North Side gang alone. He disobeys because of his lust for more power, violence, and territory. Not only does he threaten the external power structure of the gangs in relation to physical territory, but he also disrupts the internal power structure of his own gang by blatantly disobeying his boss Johnny Lovo. Gaffney's physical position juxtaposes Tony's position. Throughout the film, Gaffney's movement is restricted by both setting and implication, because of the crowded spaces in which he is shown onscreen and his troupe of henchmen he is constantly surrounded by. Tony is able to move freely at the beginning of the film, becoming progressively more crowded until he is as confined as Gaffney. He is surrounded by henchmen and cannot move as freely throughout the city. This, however, is self-imposed by his own excessive desire for territory and power.

The theme of excessiveness is further exemplified by Tony's incestuous desires for his sister, Cesca, whom he attempts to control and restrict. Their mother acts as the voice of reason, but Tony does not listen to her, subjecting his family to the excess and violence he brings upon himself. His lust for violence mirror's Cesca's lust for sexual freedom, symbolized by her seductive dance for Rinaldo at the club. Rinaldo is split between his loyalty for Tony and his passion for Cesca, serving as a symbol of the power struggle between the Camonte siblings. Rinaldo is a symbol of Tony's power and prominence; his murder signifies Tony's lack of control and downfall, which ends in Tony's own death.

American Dream

Camonte's rise to prominence and success is modeled after the American Dream, but more overtly violent. As the film follows the rise and fall of an Italian gangster, Tony becomes increasingly more Americanized. When Tony appears from under the towel at the barbershop, this is the first time the audience gets a look at his face. He appears foreign with a noticeable Italian accent, slicked hair and an almost Neanderthal appearance evident by the scars on his cheek. As the movie progresses, he becomes more Americanized as he loses his accent and his suits change from gaudy to elegant. By the end of the film, his accent is hardly noticeable. Upon the time of his death, he had accumulated many "objects" which portray the success suggested by the American Dream: his own secretary, a girlfriend of significant social status (more important even is she was the mistress of his old boss), as well as a fancy apartment, big cars, and nice clothes. Camonte exemplifies the idea of the American Dream that one can obtain success in America by following Camonte's own motto to, "Do it first, do it yourself, and keep on doin' it." On the other hand, Camonte represents the American urge to reject modern life and society, in turn rejecting Americanism itself. The gangster strives for the same American Dream as anyone else, but through violence and illicit activity, approaches it in a way at odds with modern societal values.

Gangster territory
Control of territory is a theme in the gangster film genre in a physical sense and on the movie screen. Tony works to control the city by getting rid of competing gangs and gaining physical control of the city, and he likewise gains control of the movie screen in his rise to power. This is most evident in scenes and interactions involving Tony, Johnny, and Poppy. In an early scene in the film, Tony comes to Johnny's apartment to receive his payment after killing Louie Costillo. Two rooms are visible in the shot: the main room, where Tony sits, and the room in the background where Poppy sits and where Johnny keeps his money. Lovo goes into the back room but Tony does not, so this room represents Johnny's power and territory. The men are sitting across from each other in the scene with Poppy sitting in the middle of them in the background representing the trophy they are both fighting for. However, they both appear equally in the shot, representing their equality of power. Later, in the nightclub scene, Tony sits himself in between Poppy and Johnny showing he is in control through his centrality in the shot. He has gained the most power and territory, as indicated by "winning" Poppy.

Fear of technology
Scarface represents the American fears and confusion that stemmed from the technological advancement of the time: whether technological advancement and mass production should be feared or celebrated. An overall anxiety post-World War I was whether new technology would cause ultimate destruction, or whether it would help make lives easier and bring happiness. In the film, Tony excitedly revels in the possibilities machine guns can bring by killing more people, more quickly, and from further away. This represents the question of whether or not mass production equals mass destruction or mass efficiency.

Objects and gestures
The use of playful motifs throughout the film showcased Howard Hawks's dark comedy he expressed through his directing. In the bowling alley scene, where rival gang leader Tom Gaffney was murdered, when Gaffney throws the ball, the shot remains on the last standing bowling pin, which falls to represent the death of kingpin Tom Gaffney. In the same scene, before the death of Gaffney, a shot shows an "X" on the scoreboard, foreshadowing Gaffney's death. Hawks used the "X" foreshadowing technique throughout the film (seen first in the opening credits) which were chiefly associated with death appearing many times (but not every scene) when a death is portrayed; the motif appears in numerous places, most prominently as Tony's "X" scar on his left cheek. The motifs mock the life of the gangster. The gangster's hat is a common theme throughout gangster films, specifically Scarface, as representative of conspicuous consumption. Hawks included hand gestures, a common motif in his films. In Scarface, George Raft was instructed to repetitively flip a coin, which he does throughout the film.

"The World Is Yours"
Camonte's apartment looks out on a neon, flashing sign that says "The World Is Yours". This sign represents the modern American city as a place of opportunity and individualism. As attractive as the slogan is, the message is impossible, yet Tony doesn't understand this. The view from his apartment represents the rise of the gangster. When Camonte is killed in the street outside his building, the camera pans up to show the billboard, representative of the societal paradox of the existence of opportunity yet the inability to achieve it. According to Robert Warshow, the ending scene represents how the world is not ours, but not his either. The death of the gangster momentarily releases us from the idea of the concept of success and the need to succeed. In regards to the theme of excess, the sign is a metaphor for the dividing desires created by modernity seen through the lens of the excessive desires of the gangster persona.

Style
"Sharp" and "hard-edged", Scarface set the visual style for the gangster films of the 1930s. Hawks created a violent, gripping film through his use of strong contrast of black and white in his cinematography, for example, dark rooms, silhouettes of bodies against drawn shades, and pools of carefully placed light. Much of the film is shown to take place at night. The tight grouping of subjects within the shot and stalking camera movement followed the course of action in the film. The cinematography is dynamic and characterized by highly varied camera placement and mobile framing.

Italian-language versions
In October 1946, after World War II and the relations between Italy and the United States softened, Titanus, an Italian film production company was interested in translating Scarface into Italian. Initially, upon requesting approval from the Italian film office, the request was rejected due to censorship concerns of the portrayal of violence and crime throughout the film. There was no initial concern about the film's portrayal of Italians. Titanus appealed to the Italian film office calling Scarface, "one of the most solid and constructive motion pictures ever produced overseas". They lobbied to bring in a foreign language film to help domestic film producers save money in the Italian economy damaged by the recent war. After receiving approval at the end of 1946, Titanus translated a script for dubbing the film. One difference in the Italian script is the names of the characters were changed from Italian sounding to more American sounding. For example, Tony Camonte was changed to Tony Kermont, and Guino Rinaldo was changed to Guido Reynold. This and several other changes were made to conspicuously remove references to Italians. Another example is the difference in the scene in the restaurant with Tony and Johnny. In the American version, Tony makes a comical statement about the garlic in the pasta, whereas, in the Italian translation, the food in question is a duck liver pâté, a less overtly Italian reference to food. Moreover, in the American version, the gangsters are referred to as illegal immigrants by the outraged community; however, in the Italian dubbed version, the citizen status of the criminals are not mentioned, merely the concern of repeat offenders.

The film was redubbed into Italian in 1976 by the broadcasting company Radio Televisione Italiana (RAI). Franco Dal Cer translated the script and the dub was directed by Giulio Panicali. Pino Locchi dubbed the voice of Tony Camonte for Paul Muni and Pino Colizzi dubbed the voice of Gunio Rinaldo for George Raft. A difference between the 1947 version and the 1976 version is that all of the Italian names are and Italian cultural references were untouched from the original American script. The 1976 version celebrates the Italian backgrounds of the characters, adding noticeably different Italian dialects to specific characters. This version of the dubbed film translates the opening and closing credit scenes as well as the newspaper clippings shown into Italian; however, the translation of the newspaper clippings was not done with particular aesthetic care.

The film was redubbed in the 1990s and released on Universal's digital edition. According to scholarly consensus, the 1990 dub is a combination of re-voicing and reuse of audio from the 1976 redub.

Legacy

Despite its lack of success at the box office, Scarface was one of the most discussed films of 1932 due to its subject matter, and its struggle and triumph over censor boards. Scarface is cited (often with Little Caesar and The Public Enemy) as the archetype of the gangster film genre, because it set the early standard for the genre which continues to appear in Hollywood. However, Scarface was the last of the three big gangsters films of the early 1930s, as the outrage at the Pre-Code violence caused by the three films, particularly Scarface, sparked the creation of the Production Code Administration in 1934. Howard Hawks cited Scarface as one of his favorite works and the film was a subject of pride for Howard Hughes. Hughes locked the film in his vaults a few years after release, refusing many profitable offers to distribute the film or to buy its rights. In 1979, three years after his death, Summa Corporation, which controlled his estate, sold the rights to Scarface along with seven other films to Universal Pictures, which sparked the 1983 remake starring Al Pacino. Though rare for a remake, the 1983 version was also critically acclaimed.

Paul Muni's performance in Scarface as "the quintessential gangster anti-hero" contributed greatly to his rapid ascent into his acclaimed film career. Paul Muni received significant accolades for his performance as Tony Camonte. Critics praised Muni for his robust and fierce performance. Al Pacino stated he was greatly inspired by Paul Muni and Muni influenced his own performance in the 1983 Scarface remake. However, despite the impressive portrayal of a rising gangster, critics claim the character minimally resembled Al Capone. Unlike Camonte, Capone avoided grunt work and typically employed others to do his dirty work for him. Moreover, Muni's Scarface at the end revealed the Capone character to be a coward as he pled for mercy and tried to escape before getting shot in the street. Capone wasn't known for his cowardice and didn't die in battle.

Scarface was Ann Dvorak's best known film. The film launched Raft's lengthy career as a leading man. Raft, in the film's second lead, had learned to flip a coin without looking at it, a trait of his character, and he made a strong impression in the comparatively sympathetic but colorful role. Howard Hawks told Raft to use this in the film to camouflage his lack of acting experience. A reference is made in Raft's later role as gangster Spats Columbo in Some Like it Hot (1959), wherein he asks a fellow gangster (who is flipping a coin) "Where did you pick up  cheap trick?"

The movie Scarface may have had an influence on actual gangster life four years after the film was released. In 1936, Jack McGurn who was thought to be responsible for the St. Valentine's Massacre depicted in the film, was murdered by rivals in a bowling alley.

Home media
The film was one of the first films released on video by MCA Videocassette in May 1980. The film was released on DVD on May 22, 2007, and was released again on August 28, 2012, in celebration of the 100th anniversary of Universal Studios, by Universal Pictures Home Entertainment. Both versions of the DVD include an introduction by Turner Classic Movies host and film historian Robert Osborne and the film's alternate ending. On video and on television, the film maintains Hawks's original ending but still contains the other alterations he was required to make during filming. A completely unaltered and uncensored version of the film was not known to exist until the limited edition set of Scarface (1983) was released on October 15, 2019.

Related films 
After the rights for Scarface were obtained after the death of Howard Hughes, Brian de Palma released a remake of the film in 1983 featuring Al Pacino as Scarface. The film was set in contemporary Miami and is known for its inclusion of graphic violence and obscene language, considered "as violent and obscene for the 1980s" as the original film was considered for 1930s cinema. The 2003 DVD "Anniversary Edition" limited edition box set of the 1983 film includes its 1932 counterpart. At the end of the 1983 film, a title reading "This film is dedicated to Howard Hawks and Ben Hecht" appears over the final shot.

Universal announced in 2011 that the studio is developing a new version of Scarface. The studio claims the new film is neither a sequel nor a remake, but will take elements from both the 1932 and the 1983 version, including the basic premise of a man who becomes a kingpin in his quest for the American Dream. In 2016, Antoine Fuqua was in talks to direct the remake, but left the project the following year in February, with the Coen brothers rewriting the script. Universal later hired David Ayer to direct and contracted Diego Luna to star, but dismissed Ayer because his script was too violent. In 2018, Fuqua was back on the project, but left again in May 2020. Instead, Luca Guadagnino has signed to direct the film, with the script from Coen brothers. 

Scarface is often associated with other pre-code crime films released in the early 1930s such as The Doorway to Hell (1930), Little Caesar (1931) and The Public Enemy (1931). According to Fran Mason of the University of Winchester, Scarface is more similar to the film The Roaring Twenties than its early 1930s gangster film contemporaries because of its excess.

References

Bibliography

Further reading

External links

 
 
 
 
 
 Review of film at Variety

1932 films
1932 crime drama films
American crime drama films
Censored films
1930s English-language films
American black-and-white films
Films about Al Capone
Films about dysfunctional families
Films about siblings
Films based on American novels
Films directed by Howard Hawks
Films directed by Richard Rosson
Films produced by Howard Hughes
United States National Film Registry films
United Artists films
Films with screenplays by Ben Hecht
American gangster films
Films set in Chicago
Films set in the 1920s
Films à clef
Cultural depictions of Al Capone
Cultural depictions of Johnny Torrio
Cultural depictions of Bugs Moran
Harold B. Lee Library-related film articles
Italian-language American films
1930s American films